Astragalus bakaliensis is a species of flowering plant in the large legume genus Astragalus (Fabaceae). It is native to western Asia. Astragalus bakaliensis was first formally named by Russian botanist Alexander von Bunge in 1851. It flowers in March.

References

fraternellus
Flora of Asia
Taxa named by Alexander von Bunge